Damn Nation is a three-issue horror comic book mini-series published by Dark Horse Comics in 2005 and written by Andrew Cosby with artwork from Jason Shawn Alexander.

Collected editions
The comic was published over three issues and collected in a trade paperback:

Damn Nation (3-issue mini-series, 2005, Dark Horse, tpb, 104 pages, 2005)

Movie adaption
A film adaptation was announced by Paramount Pictures in 2009, to be written by Ashley Edward Miller and Zack Stentz; as of 2015, however, it has not been produced.

Background
The Cliffhanger comic book series Out There refers to a comic book series entitled Damn Nation, which happens to be three issues as well.

Notes

References

External links

2005 comics debuts
Horror comics